Marie Womplou (born 20 December 1969) is an Ivorian hurdler. She competed in the women's 400 metres hurdles at the 1988 Summer Olympics.

References

1969 births
Living people
Athletes (track and field) at the 1988 Summer Olympics
Ivorian female hurdlers
Olympic athletes of Ivory Coast
World Athletics Championships athletes for Ivory Coast
African Games gold medalists for Ivory Coast
African Games medalists in athletics (track and field)
Place of birth missing (living people)
Athletes (track and field) at the 1991 All-Africa Games